The swimming competition at the 1999 South Asian Games  in Kathmandu, Nepal.

Result

Men's events

Women's events

References
http://www.tribuneindia.com/1999/99oct01/sports.htm
http://m.rediff.com/sports/2004/apr/01saf-swim.htm

Swimming at the South Asian Games
1999 South Asian Games
1999 in swimming